Diaphus subtilis is a species of lanternfish found in the Atlantic Ocean.

Size

References

Myctophidae
Taxa named by Basil Nafpaktitis
Fish described in 1968